Emmen is a terminus railway station located in Emmen, Netherlands. The station was opened on 1 November 1905 and is located on the Zwolle–Emmen railway. Train services are operated by Arriva.

The line continues for a short distance to a headshunt where trains can wait before returning, formerly the line continued onwards in a northerly direction with stations at Weerdinge, Exloo and Buinen, to a junction with the now closed line between Assen and Stadskanaal at Gasselternijveen. This closed in the late 1950s with the exception of a short freight only section from Gasselternijveen to Buinen which closed at the same time as Assen - Stadskanaal (early 1960s). Although the tracks have been removed, the remains of the track beds of both lines are still visible in the landscape. There are plans to reinstate the section between Emmen and Stadskanaal (and from there, connecting to the train to Veendam and Groningen).

Train services

Bus services

See also
 List of railway stations in Drenthe

References

External links
NS website 
Dutch Public Transport journey planner 

Railway stations in Drenthe
Railway stations opened in 1905
Railway stations on the Emmerlijn
1905 establishments in the Netherlands
Buildings and structures in Emmen, Netherlands
Railway stations in the Netherlands opened in the 20th century